The Tākaka Aerodrome serves the town of Tākaka, in the South Island of New Zealand.

Description
Tākaka Aerodrome is northwest of the town. State Highway 60 runs just south of Runway 36. It was established in 1940 and is owned by the Tasman District Council.

There are two runways at the aerodrome.

Airlines and destinations

See also

 List of airports in New Zealand
 List of airlines of New Zealand
 Transport in New Zealand

Sources
AIP New Zealand Aerodrome Chart (PDF)
Golden Bay Air

References

Airports in New Zealand
Transport in the Tasman District
Transport buildings and structures in the Tasman District
Tākaka